St. Stephen's Episcopal School may refer to:

St. Stephen's Episcopal School (Austin, Texas)
St. Stephen's Episcopal School (Bradenton, Florida)
St. Stephen's Episcopal School (Houston, Texas)

See also
St. Stephen's School (disambiguation)